MySims is a video game developed by EA Redwood Shores and published by Electronic Arts as a spin-off to Maxis' The Sims franchise for the Wii and Nintendo DS in September 2007, re-released for Microsoft Windows in 2008.

Overview

Gameplay 
The game puts players in charge of redeveloping a town that has become run down because a resident who had the power to use essences moved away. Through creative building and design elements, players will take over the new role as a government leader to improve the town, which attracts new residents, who subsequently need homes built for them. Customization is a large element of the game, including houses, furniture and outfits.

Apart from creating a custom Mii-like character, players may also modify their houses and build furniture and appliances using a selection of building blocks. This gives the player more building options, allowing them to create objects by using blueprints, a change from the usual virtual catalog found in The Sims. There are 80 characters with whom the player may interact in the Wii version (30 characters in the Nintendo DS version), such as a mad scientist, a magician, a librarian, a pizza chef, and a martial arts teacher. Some of these characters may ask the player to build things for them. As with previous Sims games, meeting people and forming relationships is a major gameplay focus, but unlike The Sims games, the characters do not have to fulfil needs such as hunger and sleep. Becoming a Sim's best friend will earn the player either a special blueprint not available anywhere else in the game, or a style of clothing for their wardrobe. Players can also earn blueprints by performing tasks for Commercial Sims (Sims who have their own businesses). Typically this involves building around 5-10 items for Sims, depending on the Star Level (the 1-5 level) of the player's town and the essences they have access to.

A feature new to MySims is "Essences". They can be found in various locations in town or by interacting with Sims or objects. Essences are used for a number of things including paint for the walls of houses, construction of items, as well as decoration.

The minigames in the DS Version include racquetball, paragliding, Scuba diving and more.

The GameBoy Advance version of this title was scrapped early in development.

Character design 
Compared to previous Sims titles, MySims has a more Chibi-inspired look, with cute character designs. This was Emmy Toyonaga's idea; in Official Nintendo Magazine she remarked: "Well, Mario and other Nintendo characters are pretty short and stubby. Also, being Japanese, I'm used to the mindset that fun games should have shorter, stubbier characters. So these characters kind of came naturally". Official Nintendo Magazine, March 2007 In Nintendo Power, designer Robin Hunicke said that the character designs also imply youthfulness, and that the aesthetic was chosen for worldwide appeal, while referring to the lesser sales of previous Sims games in Japan compared to other territories.

MySims also differs from The Sims games by introducing a designed cast of characters rather than procedurally-generated "townies." Every NPC the player encounters has their own name, personality, and backstory.

Music 
The game's music was composed by John Enroth and Silas Hite of Mutato Muzika. The music changes depending on what type of building the player is visiting. There is a specific motif for each business and for each Interest, which will play when the player approaches a building.

Reception 

In 2008, Edge reported that more than 1 millions copies of the game had been sold in the United-States. The game features among the best-selling Nintendo DS video games.

The PC version of MySims as well as the Wii and Nintendo DS versions received "Mixed or average reviews" according to review aggregator Metacritic. IGN said that "The problem is that nearly all of the objectives revolve around the same two tasks: the collection of essences and the construction of houses, buildings and items. All of the Sim management and social interaction elements of the previous games – well, you're not going to find much of that in the streamlined Wii affair". GameSpot praised the Wii game for the construction being intuitive and flexible and for the presentation being cheery and clean. It was also criticized for having longer than usual load times. Its Nintendo DS counterpart is regarded as virtually an all new game in design; However, reception of its control scheme varied greatly. Resolution said the game would be enjoyed by "those whose age is a single digit," but that the game would quickly grow tiresome for anybody else.

Sequels 
Five sequels have been released for MySims.

References

External links 

2007 video games
Electronic Arts games
Electronic Arts franchises
Life simulation games
Nintendo DS games
The Sims
Social simulation video games
Wii games
Windows games
Video games developed in Japan
Visceral Games
Video games using Havok
Video games developed in the United States

de:Die Sims#MySims